Kurt Alder (10 July 1902 – 20 June 1958) was a German chemist and Nobel laureate.

Biography
Alder was born in the industrial area of Königshütte, Silesia (modern day Chorzów, Upper Silesia, Poland), where he received his early schooling. Alder left the area when Königshütte became part of Poland in 1922. He studied chemistry at the University of Berlin from 1922, and later at the University of Kiel where his PhD was awarded in 1926 for work supervised by Otto Paul Hermann Diels.

In 1930 Alder was appointed reader for chemistry at Kiel, and promoted to lecturer in 1934. In 1936 he left Kiel to join I G Farben Industrie at Leverkusen, where he worked on synthetic rubber. Then in 1940 he was appointed Professor of Experimental Chemistry and Chemical Technology at the  University of Cologne and Director of the Institute of Chemistry there. Throughout this time and despite the many obstacles to original research in Europe at the time, he continued a systematic program of investigations of his particular interests in the synthesis of organic compounds. In all he published more than 151 papers in this field.

In 1945 he worked closely with the inventor of EDTA, Ferdinand Münz. In 1949 they published a paper together on diene synthesis and additions 

Alder received several honorary degrees and other awards, such as the 1950 Nobel Prize in Chemistry which he shared with his teacher Diels for their work on what is now known as the Diels–Alder reaction. The lunar crater Alder is named in his honour. The insecticide aldrin, created through a Diels–Alder reaction, is also named after the scientist.

Alder died in June 1958, aged 55. The cause of his death is unknown, however his body was found in his apartment in Cologne, Germany after two weeks. His niece, who found the body, stated that the odor of rotting flesh was so bad that she could smell it from the street outside. Gertrud Alder reported that her husband was incredibly distressed when she last saw him and often muttered the phrase "Les Jardins du Souvenir" (The Memory Garden) whilst writing out his research notes.

References

External links

 including the Nobel Lecture on December 12, 1950 Diene Synthesis and Related Reaction Types
 English Translation of Diels and Alder's seminal 1928 German article that won them the Nobel prize. English title: 'Syntheses of the hydroaromatic series'; German title "Synthesen in der hydroaromatischen Reihe".

Organic chemists
20th-century German chemists
People from the Province of Silesia
German Nobel laureates
Nobel laureates in Chemistry
People from Chorzów
University of Kiel alumni
Academic staff of the University of Kiel
Academic staff of the University of Cologne
Humboldt University of Berlin alumni
1902 births
1958 deaths